The 1990 Daytona 500, the 32nd running of the event, was held on February 18, 1990 at Daytona International Speedway in Daytona Beach, Florida over 200 laps on the 2.5 mile (4 km) asphalt tri-oval. The first race of the 1990 Winston Cup Series season, it was won by Bob Whitcomb's entrant Derrike Cope.  Terry Labonte finished second, followed by Bill Elliott, Ricky Rudd, and Dale Earnhardt.

This race was the first Daytona 500 starts for Jimmy Spencer, Rich Bickle, Hut Stricklin, and Jimmy Horton. This was also the only Daytona 500 starts for Butch Miller, Jack Pennington, Jerry O'Neil, and Rob Moroso. And this was the final Daytona 500 starts for Larry Pearson and Mike Alexander. 

During the running of the race, Hollywood was filming the movie “Days of Thunder” starring Tom Cruise and Nicole Kidman. The cars weren't scored and were removed from the race before the halfway point.

Race review
In the Thursday Gatorade 125-mile qualifier, he crashed on the last lap and had to use a backup car on Sunday. He quickly passed several cars at the start. By the first caution flag, Schrader had driven up to second place. Geoff Bodine led the first lap of the race and the season. Two cars used to create film footage for the upcoming movie Days of Thunder, driven by Bobby Hamilton and Tommy Ellis, started the race in the last row, completing 100 miles before parking. Those cars were not listed in the official race results.

On Lap 27, Richard Petty (who started a promising 11th) spun ahead of Phil Parsons while running 13th. The spin left him with all four tires flat, meaning The King would need a wrecker to take him to the pits for new tires, and he would finish well down the order in 34th. During the yellow, Davey Allison (running 6th) pitted with the leaders and hit the pit wall. This was unnoticed by the television broadcast for several minutes; no injuries were reported but Mike Joy confirmed left front toe damage.

On Lap 43, an accident occurred between the tri-oval and Turn 1 involving Mike Alexander, Alan Kulwicki (who would continue), Phil Parsons, and 1989 NASCAR Busch Series champion and Winston Cup rookie Rob Moroso. Moroso said he touched Phil Parsons' left rear with his own right front after Parsons came down on him, and Parsons explained that he was attempting a pass on A. J. Foyt. After 58 laps, Schrader's run to the front was halted by an engine failure. Shortly after halfway, 1972 winner A. J. Foyt quit after experiencing a bizarre problem: In a mid-race interview with CBS's David Hobbs, Foyt claimed he had become intoxicated by fumes produced by his new racing helmet.

Dale Earnhardt dominated the race. He led nearly 3/4 of the laps, relinquishing the lead briefly to Bill Elliott, Mark Martin, Derrike Cope, Davey Allison, Geoff Bodine, Terry Labonte, and Bobby Hillin Jr. Daytona 500 rookies Jimmy Spencer and Jack Pennington led yellow flag laps early in the race.

Dale Earnhardt had the race in his grasp with a lead of more than 40 seconds until lap 193 when Geoff Bodine spun in the first turn, causing the third and final caution of the race. Derrike Cope assumed the lead again by staying out, a call made by crew chief Buddy Parrott. The Top 5 on the restart were Cope, Bobby Hillin Jr., Earnhardt, Terry Labonte, and Bill Elliott. Earnhardt dispatched Cope and Hillin simultaneously with help from Geoff Bodine, who was one lap down. With a few laps remaining, Rick Wilson in the RahMoc car lost an engine, and a piece of metal bell housing from that engine had tumbled to a stop on the backstretch. On the last lap, Earnhardt ran over it and shredded the right rear tire. He held the wheel straight, let off the throttle and let his car climb the banking of turn three. Spanaway, Washington's Derrike Cope drove by Earnhardt to his first ever Winston Cup victory. His previous best career finish was 6th the previous year at Charlotte. Although Earnhardt would lose the race, his crew took the shredded tire and hung it on the wall of the race shop using the loss as motivation to win the 1990 Winston Cup championship. Meanwhile, Cope would become an overnight sensation appearing on The Late Show a week or so later to talk about his big win. Although it is considered one of the biggest upsets in NASCAR history, the ratings did not quite show it, as it drew a 7.3, the lowest in Daytona 500 history.

Results

Notes

References
NASCAR, The 1990 Daytona 500
Daytona 500 history
Nextel Cup Results msn

Daytona 500
Daytona 500
NASCAR races at Daytona International Speedway